Aouint Yghomane (also spelled Aouint Ighoumane) is a rural commune in the Assa-Zag Province, Guelimim-Oued Noun Region, Morocco. The municipality has a population of 3,042 with 470 households as of 2014.

References 

Populated places in Guelmim-Oued Noun